Lynne Marie Stewart (born December 14, 1946) is an American actress, best known for her performance as Miss Yvonne, the Most Beautiful Woman in Puppet Land. She originated the role in the 1981 stage show The Pee-wee Herman Show, continuing it on the CBS television show Pee-wee's Playhouse, the 2010 Los Angeles stage revival, and the Broadway production which opened in November 2010 at the Stephen Sondheim Theatre.

Early life
Stewart was born in Los Angeles, California.

Career
Stewart was a member of The Groundlings in the 1970s, and met both Paul Reubens and Phil Hartman there.

Stewart played several different nurses on the television series M*A*S*H. She had a small part in the 1973 film American Graffiti as Bobbie, who drove the car of girls who pick up Curt (Richard Dreyfuss) in one scene. She appeared on an episode of the television series Night Court as Vanna Anders. She played a variety of characters, including Squiggy's two-timing girlfriend Barbara, on Laverne & Shirley. She provided Shirley's voice in the Saturday morning cartoon Mork & Mindy/Laverne & Shirley/Fonz Hour. She worked with Tracey Ullman in Tracey Ullman in the Trailer Tales for HBO and Tracey Ullman's State of the Union for Showtime. She played a nun in Season 6 episode 8 of The Golden Girls.

Stewart starred in Pee-wee's Big Adventure, Big Top Pee-wee, The Running Man, Night Stand with Dick Dietrick, and Son of the Beach. She guest-starred on the Disney shows Austin and Ally and Good Luck Charlie in 2011.

She has appeared in Raising Hope, Marvin Marvin, Comedy Bang! Bang!, and in the 2011 film Bridesmaids. She has a recurring role as Charlie's mom on It's Always Sunny in Philadelphia.

She appeared on a Biography profile of her best friend Cindy Williams. In 2011 at the Surflight Theatre, in New Jersey, she appeared in an all-female version of The Odd Couple, starring Cindy Williams and Jo Anne Worley.

References

External links

Lynne Marie Stewart at Aveleyman

1946 births
Living people
American film actresses
American television actresses
American stage actresses
American voice actresses
Actresses from Los Angeles
21st-century American women